Delmas Carl Hill (October 9, 1906 – December 2, 1989) was a United States circuit judge of the United States Court of Appeals for the Tenth Circuit and previously was a United States district judge of the United States District Court for the District of Kansas.

Education and career
Born in Wamego, Kansas, Hill received a Bachelor of Laws from Washburn University School of Law in 1929. He was in private practice in Wamego at various times between 1929 and 1943, also serving as the city attorney of Wamego from 1929 to 1934 and from 1937 to 1943, and as county attorney of Pottawatomie County, Kansas from 1931 to 1934. He was the United States Attorney for the District of Kansas from 1934 to 1936. He was general counsel to the Kansas State Tax Commission from 1937 to 1939. He was in the Judge Advocate General's Corps, United States Army during World War II from 1943 to 1946 and became a first lieutenant upon graduation from the Army Judge Advocate Training Center. He was on the military commission for the prosecution of crimes that violated the Laws of War. After military service, he returned to practice in Wamego until 1949.

Federal judicial service

District Court service
Hill received a recess appointment from President Harry S. Truman on October 21, 1949, to the United States District Court for the District of Kansas, to a new seat authorized by 63 Stat. 493. He was nominated to the same position by President Truman on January 5, 1950. He was confirmed by the United States Senate on March 8, 1950, and received his commission on March 9, 1950. He served as Chief Judge from 1957 to 1961. His service terminated on September 28, 1961, due to elevation to the Tenth Circuit.

Court of Appeals service
Hill was nominated by President John F. Kennedy on September 14, 1961, to the United States Court of Appeals for the Tenth Circuit, to a new seat authorized by 75 Stat. 80. He was confirmed by the Senate on September 21, 1961, and received his commission on September 22, 1961. He assumed senior status on April 1, 1977. His service terminated on December 2, 1989, due to his death.

References

Sources
 

1906 births
1989 deaths
Washburn University alumni
Judges of the United States District Court for the District of Kansas
United States district court judges appointed by Harry S. Truman
20th-century American judges
Judges of the United States Court of Appeals for the Tenth Circuit
United States court of appeals judges appointed by John F. Kennedy
United States Army officers
20th-century American lawyers
People from Wamego, Kansas
United States Army Judge Advocate General's Corps
United States Army personnel of World War II